The 2023 UEFA European Under-21 Championship qualifying competition was a men's under-21 football competition to determine the 14 teams that would be joining the automatically qualified co-hosts Romania and Georgia in the 2023 UEFA European Under-21 Championship final tournament.

Apart from Romania and Georgia, all remaining 53 UEFA member national teams entered the qualifying competition. Players born on or after 1 January 2000 are eligible to participate.

Format 
The qualifying competition will consist of the following two rounds:

 Qualifying group stage: The 53 teams are drawn into nine groups: eight groups of six teams and one group of five teams. Each group is played in home-and-away round-robin format. The nine group winners and the best runner-up (not counting results against the sixth-placed team) qualify directly for the final tournament, while the remaining eight runners-up advance to the play-offs.
 Play-offs: The eight teams are drawn into four ties to play home-and-away two-legged matches to determine the last four qualified teams.

Tiebreakers
In the qualifying group stage, teams are ranked according to points (3 points for a win, 1 point for a draw, 0 points for a loss), and if tied on points, the following tiebreaking criteria are applied, in the order given, to determine the rankings (Regulations Article 14.01):
Points in head-to-head matches among tied teams;
Goal difference in head-to-head matches among tied teams;
Goals scored in head-to-head matches among tied teams;
Away goals scored in head-to-head matches among tied teams;
If more than two teams are tied, and after applying all head-to-head criteria above, a subset of teams are still tied, all head-to-head criteria above are reapplied exclusively to this subset of teams;
Goal difference in all group matches;
Goals scored in all group matches;
Away goals scored in all group matches;
Wins in all group matches;
Away wins in all group matches;
Disciplinary points (red card = 3 points, yellow card = 1 point, expulsion for two yellow cards in one match = 3 points);
UEFA coefficient ranking for the qualifying group stage draw.

To determine the best runner-up from the qualifying group stage, the results against the teams in sixth place are discarded. The following criteria are applied (Regulations Article 15.02):
Points;
Goal difference;
Goals scored;
Away goals scored;
Wins;
Away wins;
Disciplinary points;
UEFA coefficient ranking for the qualifying group stage draw.

Schedule

Qualifying group stage

Draw 

Each group contained one team from each of Pots A–F (Pots A–E for five-team group). Based on the decisions taken by the UEFA Emergency Panel, the following teams would not be drawn in the same group.

 Armenia and Azerbaijan
 Gibraltar and Spain
 Bosnia and Herzegovina and Kosovo
 Kosovo and Serbia
 Kosovo and Russia
 Russia and Ukraine

Groups

Group A

Group B

Group C 

On 28 February 2022, FIFA and UEFA announced that Russia was suspended from all competitions. On 2 May 2022, UEFA announced that Russia would no longer be allowed to take part in the competition, that their previous results were nullified, and that Group C would continue with five teams.

Group D

Group E

Group F

Group G

Group H

Group I

Ranking of second-placed teams 
Only the results of the second-placed teams against the first, third, fourth and fifth-placed teams in their group are taken into account, while results against the sixth-placed team in six-team groups are not included. As a result, eight matches played by each second-placed team are counted for the purposes of determining the ranking. The top-ranked team qualifies directly for the final tournament, while the other teams enter the play-offs.

Advanced teams

Play-offs 

The draw for the play-offs was held on 21 June 2022 in Nyon, Switzerland.

|}

Qualified teams 
The following teams qualified for the final tournament.

Note: All appearance statistics include only U-21 era (since 1978).

Top goalscorers

References

External links 

qualification
 
2021 in youth association football
2022 in youth association football
Under-21
Under-21
Sports events affected by the 2022 Russian invasion of Ukraine